Vaira is a 2017 suspense thriller film that was written and directed by Navarasan, who also starred alongside Priyanka Malnad and Tabla Nani. The music was scored by Ravi Basrur and the cinematographer was Naveen, with editing by Mahesh Reddy.

Plot 
The story revolves around the assignment of a fashion photographer who travels to Madikeri, there he meets a local girl, and falls in love with her. The investigation also leads to a haunted house. However, during his stay at Madikeri, he encounters a series of supernatural incidents and attempts to solve the mystery around them. The film is said to be inspired by real life incidents.

Cast
 Navarasan
 Priyanka Malnad
 Tabla Nani
 Priyanka
 Kempegowda

Soundtrack
The music is scored by Ravi Basrur. The soundtrack was released on 9 August 2017, and featured 2 tracks. The lyrics were written by Kinnal.

Reception 
The Times of India rated the film at 3/5 stars, stating that it "can be a good one-time-watch for fans of horror, given that there has been a slump in recent times." Vastavam TV also reviewed Vaira and had a similar outlook, as they felt that it was "a one time watchable if you love suspense thriller movies."

References

External links
 
 

2017 films
Indian horror films
2017 horror films
2010s Kannada-language films